Aviation pioneers are people directly and indirectly responsible for the advancement of flight, including people who worked to achieve manned flight before the invention of aircraft, as well as others who achieved significant "firsts" in aviation after heavier-than-air flight became routine. Pioneers of aviation have contributed to the development of aeronautics in one or more ways: through science and theory, theoretical or applied design, by constructing models or experimental prototypes, the mass production of aircraft for commercial and government request, achievements in flight, and providing financial resources and publicity to expand the field of aviation.

Table key

Pioneer type
 Science: Contributions to aerodynamic theory, aviation principles, discoveries advancing aircraft development, etc.
 Design: Original or derivative ideas or drawings for conceptual/experimental/practical methods of air travel
 Construction: Building prototypes/experimental/practical aircraft
 Manufacture: Building aircraft to fill commercial or government requests
 Aviator: International firsts, major records, major awards received
 Support: Significant industrial endorsements, philanthropic, founding of relevant organizations, etc.
(†) : A dagger following the pioneer's name indicates they died in or as a result of an aircraft accident. When available, the aircraft type/model and the place of the accident are included in the text.

Sorting
The table is organized by pioneer name in alphabetical order. Columns for Name, Date of birth/Date of death, Country and Achievement can be sorted in either ascending or descending order. If two pioneers are paired together, sorting by DOB or Country uses the information for the first of the pair. The Achievement column will sort according to the date of the pioneer's earliest significant contribution to aviation.

Inclusion criteria

The list is of outright records, irrespective of race, nationality or gender, and in which at least one of the following criteria is met:
Scientific contribution to theory and principles (whether correct or not) that were used as contemporary resources, building blocks, or influenced period thought, significant scientific or theoretical achievements with model aircraft;
Designing any aircraft (pre-1910), or a distinct/innovative new design;
Constructing a prototype aircraft (pre-1910);
Manufacturing aircraft (including some direct or supervisory control over design) for commercial and/or military contracts (intended to represent founders of the aviation industry);
Flying (Aviator) solo in an aircraft and receiving a relevant flying certificate (pre-1910); or any significant national (e.g., a flight representing a country's first) or international achievement, or flight award (initial record holders or demolishing existing records, but not simply breaking established records);
Supporting aviation (e.g., positive publicity; personal, corporate and/or philanthropic sponsorship, education).

Table

See also

 History of aviation
 Timeline of women in aviation

Notes

References

Books

Pioneers